Mia Jolie Doucet Vallée (born March 22, 2001) is a Canadian diver in the springboard (1 and 3 metre) events.

Career
Vallée made her national team debut at the 2016 FINA Grand Prix. At the 2022 FINA Grand Prix stop in Calgary, Vallée and partner Margo Erlam won the gold medal in the 3 metres synchro event, in their second competition together. Vallée's strong performances in 2022 led her to be named to 2022 World Aquatics Championships team. At the World Championships, Vallée won bronze in the one metre individual springboard event. Later, Vallée followed the bronze medal with a silver medal finish in the three metre individual springboard event. Vallée finished the event with a fifth place finish in the synchro 3 m event with partner Margo Erlam.

In June 2022, Vallée was named to Canada's 2022 Commonwealth Games team. She won a gold medal in the 1 metre springboard event and bronze medals in the women's 3 metre springboard event and women's synchronised 3 metre springboard event alongside Margo Erlam.

References

2001 births
Living people
Canadian female divers
People from Beaconsfield, Quebec
World Aquatics Championships medalists in diving
Divers at the 2022 Commonwealth Games
Commonwealth Games medallists in diving
Commonwealth Games gold medallists for Canada
Commonwealth Games bronze medallists for Canada
21st-century Canadian women
Medallists at the 2022 Commonwealth Games